Belgian Open can refer to:
Belgian Open (golf)
Belgian Open (tennis)